Linaria alpina, sometimes called alpine toadflax, is a purple-flowered plant native to mountainous areas of southern and central Europe. It belongs to the family Plantaginaceae (plantain family; unrelated to the fruit).

It is found in many mountain ranges in southern and central Europe from the Sierra de Gredos and the Montes de León in Spain  to the mountains of the Balkan Peninsula including the Jura mountains Alps, Pyrenees, and central Apennines.

It is an early colonist of recently exposed and unconsolidated glacial moraine.

In contrast to other members of the genus, L. alpina has purple flowers, with orange lobes in the centre (in some forms, these are also purple).

References

External links

Linaria alpina in Topwalks

alpina
Alpine flora
Flora of the Alps
Taxa named by Philip Miller
Flora of the Carpathians
Flora of the Pyrenees